Dorosłe dzieci is the first studio album by the Polish heavy metal band Turbo. It was released in 1983 in Poland through Polton. The album was recorded in July, August and November 1982 at Rozgłośnia Polskiego Radia studio in Szczecin. The cover art was created by Alek Januszewski and photographs by Antoni Zdebiak.

Track listing

Personnel

Release history

References

1982 debut albums
Turbo (Polish band) albums
Polish-language albums